Lasiopogon ponticulus is a species of flowering plant in the family Asteraceae. It is found only in Namibia. Its natural habitat is cold desert. It is threatened by habitat loss.

References

ponticulus
Flora of Namibia
Least concern plants
Taxonomy articles created by Polbot